Cullen Castle was a royal castle about  west of Cullen, Moray, Scotland, west of the burn of Deskford, and south of Seatown. The remains have been designated as a Scheduled Ancient Monument, accessible to the public. This is not to be confused with Cullen House or Castle of Cullen of Buchan.  There is also a ruin of a Cullen Castle in County Waterford, Ireland.

History
Elizabeth de Burgh, the wife of Robert the Bruce died here, although it has been suggested this was at an earlier castle. Vestiges of the castle remained until the 19th century.

Structure
It is believed that the castle, on Castle Hill, was a motte, encircled by a wide ditch and outer rampart, except on the north where a landslip has destroyed it.

The mound of the motte has been covered by a network of ancient paths. Excavations were conducted in February–October 2017 to restore parts of the network and minimise erosion. Eight test pits were dug of which seven located the main path. Foundation bases for picnic tables and benches and a replacement flagpole socket were installed during the excavations. No finds or features of archaeological interest were found.

References

Castles in Moray
Former castles in Scotland